Mestawat Tadesse (born 19 July 1985) is an Ethiopian middle distance runner who specializes in the 1500 metres.
 
Tadesse finished fifth at the 2006 African Championships and tenth at the 2006 World Athletics Final.

Personal bests
800 metres - 2:05.40 min (2004)
1500 metres - 4:04.61 min (2006)
One mile - 4:28.51 min (2003)
3000 metres - 9:01.86 min (2005)

External links

1985 births
Living people
Ethiopian female middle-distance runners
Athletes (track and field) at the 2004 Summer Olympics
Olympic athletes of Ethiopia
20th-century Ethiopian women
21st-century Ethiopian women